The 1973–74 Boise State Broncos men's basketball team represented Boise State College during the 1973–74 NCAA Division I men's basketball season. The Broncos were led by head coach Bus Connor, in his first full season, and played their home games on campus at Bronco Gymnasium in Boise, Idaho.

Senior guard Clyde Dickey was named to the all-conference team; junior forward George Wilson was honorable mention.

There was no conference tournament yet; it debuted two years later, and Boise State won it.

References

External links
Sports Reference – Boise State Broncos – 1973–74 basketball season

Boise State Broncos men's basketball seasons
Boise State